Lightning Peak is a summit in the Midway Range of the Monashee Mountains, British Columbia, Canada. It is an eroded volcanic outcrop in the Chilcotin Group. Peridot can be found at this peak. Lightning Peak is thought to have formed as a result of extension of the crust behind the coastal subduction zone and last erupted during the Pliocene. Like most volcanoes in British Columbia, Lightning Peak is part of the Pacific Ring of Fire, that includes over 160 active volcanoes.

See also
 List of volcanoes in Canada
 Volcanism in Canada
 Volcanism in Western Canada

References
 

Volcanoes of British Columbia
Two-thousanders of British Columbia
Pliocene volcanoes
Monashee Mountains
Osoyoos Division Yale Land District